A woofer is a large loudspeaker driver. 

Woofer may also refer to:

 Bob Davis (Australian rules footballer)
 Wilderness First Responder, an individual trained in first aid
 WWOOFer, a WWOOF (Willing Workers on Organic Farms) volunteer
 A  dog